Saint Aemilian ((in Latin Emilianus or Aemilianus) (12 November 472 – 11 June 573) is an Iberic saint, widely revered throughout Spain, who lived during the age of Visigothic rule.

Life
According to his Vita, written by Braulio, the bishop of Caesaraugusta (modern Zaragoza) roughly a hundred years after the saint's death, Aemilian was born in Vergaja, which is identified with Berceo in La Rioja, where he was a shepherd.

Aemilian had a religious experience, perhaps around the age of twenty, which led him to decide to dedicate himself to God's service. He sought out an experienced hermit in Bilibio, Felix (more usually known by the Spanish form of his common name, San Felices), where Aemilian lived for a number of years.

After leaving his teacher, Aemilian lived as a hermit (perhaps even a gyrovagus) in the mountains or on the historic Roman road which became the Camino de Santiago. Didymus the Bishop of Tarazona ordained Aemilian and appointed him parish priest of  Vergaja.  However, Aemilian aroused the opposition of his fellow priests because of his heavy distribution of alms or reputation for holiness or miracle working. Aemilian returned to the wilderness, and a small community of disciples gathered around his cell. He died at a venerable age, and his body, was initially interred at his hermitage, but later transferred to a monastery built in memory of him.

Veneration
Braulio also recorded miracles that occurred after death of Aemilian, but the fame of the  San Millán de la Cogolla monastery dedicated in his memory (and which held his tomb) eclipsed that of its founder. San Millán de Suso monastery is known for its Mozarabic architecture, and its growing popularity during the heyday of the pilgrimage rout led to its expansion in the eleventh century with San Millán de Yuso (the communities however having separate abbots until the 12th century). 

The longstanding monastic community (Benedictine by the mid-medieval era) is credited with one of the oldest books written in the Spanish language, the Vida de San Millán de la Cogolla (biography by Gonzalo de Berceo). St. Dominic of Silos (the miracleworker for whom Saint Dominic was named) also received his education and began his religious career at San Millan monastery. 

He is a patron saint of La Rioja; the longer name of San Millán de la Cogolla refers to the monastic cowl. Because of the monastery's role on the traditional pilgrimage route, representations of Aemilian can be mixed with that of Saint James the Moor-slayer, such as a Benedictine on horseback with a banner and sword.

See also
San Millán de la Cogolla, La Rioja
:es:Monasterio de San Millán de Yuso
:es:Monasterio de San Millán de Suso7

References

External links
Dictionary of Christian Biography and Literature to the End of the Sixth Century A.D.
Catholic Online
Official page of the monastery of Yuso
1601 Editio princeps of Braulio's Life of Emilian

472 births
573 deaths
Medieval Spanish saints
6th-century Christian saints